The 1980–81 Ice hockey Bundesliga season was the 23rd season of the Ice hockey Bundesliga, the top level of ice hockey in Germany. 12 teams participated in the league, and SC Riessersee won the championship.

First round

Relegation

Playoffs

Quarterfinals (annulled)

Quarterfinals

Semifinals

3rd place

Final

References

External links
Season on hockeyarchives.info

Eishockey-Bundesliga seasons
Ger
Bundesliga